The 1970 Texas–Arlington Rebels football team was an American football team that represented the University of Texas at Arlington in the Southland Conference during the 1970 NCAA College Division football season. In their fifth year under head coach Burley Bearden, the team compiled an 0–10 record. After the conclusion of the season on December 9, head coach Bearden resigned to take a position as an assistant professor within UTA's physical education department. The 1970 season also marked the final UTA competed as the Rebels before transitioning to the Mavericks for their 1971 season.

Schedule

References

Texas–Arlington
Texas–Arlington Mavericks football seasons
College football winless seasons
Texas–Arlington Rebels football